Speedy Gonzales is an animated cartoon character in the Warner Bros. Looney Tunes and Merrie Melodies series of cartoons. He is portrayed as "The Fastest Mouse in all Mexico" with his major traits being the ability to run extremely fast, being quick-witted and heroic while speaking with an exaggerated Mexican accent. He usually wears a yellow sombrero, white shirt and trousers (which was a common traditional outfit worn by men and boys of rural Mexican villages), and a red kerchief, similar to that of some traditional Mexican attires. To date, there have been 46 theatrical shorts made either starring or featuring the character.

History

Speedy's first appearance was in 1953's Cat-Tails for Two though he appeared largely in name (and super speed) only. It would be two years before Friz Freleng and layout artist Hawley Pratt redesigned the character into his modern incarnation for the 1955 Freleng short of the same name. The cartoon features Sylvester the Cat guarding a cheese factory at the international border between the United States and Mexico from starving Mexican mice. The mice call in the plucky, excessively energetic Speedy (voiced by Mel Blanc) to save them. Amid cries of "¡Ándale! ¡Ándale! ¡Arriba! ¡Arriba! ¡Epe! ¡Epe! ¡Epe! Yeehaw!" (Spanish for "Go on! Go on! Up! Up!", although "Ándale arriba" may have been intended as meaning "hurry up"), Sylvester soon gets his comeuppance. The cartoon won the 1955 Academy Award for Best Short Subject (Cartoons).

While Speedy's last name was given as Gonzalez in Cat-Tails (on a printed business card shown in the cartoon), it was spelled with an 's' from Speedy Gonzales onward. Today, the earlier spelling is sometimes used.

Freleng and McKimson soon set Sylvester up as Speedy's regular nemesis in a series of cartoons, much in the same way Chuck Jones had paired Wile E. Coyote and the Road Runner in his Road Runner cartoons (and indeed, all four characters ended up competing with each other in the short "The Wild Chase"). Sylvester (often called "El Gringo Pussygato" by Speedy) is constantly outsmarted and outrun by the Mouse, causing the cat to suffer all manner of pain and humiliation from mousetraps to accidentally consuming large amounts of Tabasco hot sauce. Other cartoons pair the mouse with his cousin, Slowpoke Rodriguez, the "slowest Mouse in all Mexico." Slowpoke regularly gets into all sorts of trouble that often require Speedy to save him—but one cat in Mexicali Shmoes says that as if to compensate for his slowness, "he pack a gun!" In the mid 1960s, Speedy's main rival and second nemesis became Daffy Duck, whom Speedy usually referred to as "the loco duck."

Speedy has the reputation of being a hit with the female mice. In many cartoons, when the mice decide to get Speedy to help them, one mouse will say words to the effect of "Speedy Gonzales is friend of my sister". Another mouse will say "Speedy Gonzales is friend of everyone's sister".

Notable cartoon appearances
 Cat-Tails for Two (1953) - Early version
 Speedy Gonzales (1955) - Debut, official, Academy Award-winner, 28th (1955) - Short Subject (Cartoon)
 Tabasco Road (1957), Academy Award-nominated
 Mexicali Shmoes (1959), Academy Award-nominated
 The Pied Piper of Guadalupe (1961), Academy Award-nominated
 A Message to Gracias (1964)
 It's Nice to Have a Mouse Around the House (1965) - first appearance with Daffy Duck.
 See Ya Later Gladiator (1968) - final theatrical appearance.

Concern about stereotypes
Feeling that the character presented an offensive Mexican stereotype, Cartoon Network shelved Speedy's films when it gained exclusive rights to broadcast them in 1999 (as a subsidiary of Time Warner, Cartoon Network is a corporate sibling to Warner Bros.). In an interview with Fox News on March 28, 2002, Cartoon Network spokeswoman Laurie Goldberg commented, "It hasn't been on the air for years because of its ethnic stereotypes."

The Hispanic-American rights organization League of United Latin American Citizens called Speedy a cultural icon, and thousands of users registered their support of the character on the hispaniconline.com message boards. Fan campaigns to put Speedy back on the air resulted in the return of the animated shorts to Cartoon Network in 2002.

Despite such dubious controversy over a generally positive characterization in a cartoon character created in 1953, Speedy Gonzales remained a popular character in Latin America. Many Hispanic people remembered him fondly as a quick-witted, heroic Mexican character who always got the best of his opponents, at a time when such positive depictions of Latin Americans were rare in popular entertainment.

In 2006, Volkswagen licensed Speedy Gonzales for a series of Spanish-language commercials for the Volkswagen Golf, using footage from the cartoon of the same name.

In a March 2021 essay, Los Angeles Times columnist Gustavo Arellano wrote, “I love Speedy so much, I keep a large painting of him in my home office. His kind smile and brown skin takes me back to my childhood — and reminds me of where we as Mexicans exist today.”

Other appearances

In 1983, he co-starred with Daffy Duck once again in Daffy Duck's Movie: Fantastic Island. He also made a cameo appearance in the finale sequence of the  1988 film Who Framed Roger Rabbit. He had one appearance in the Tiny Toons episode segment "The Acme Acres Summer Olympics", as the coach, and serving as the mentor of Lightning Rodriguez. He had a minor role in the 1996 film Space Jam. He made a cameo appearance alongside Porky Pig in the 2003 film Looney Tunes: Back in Action, making fun of his politically incorrect status. At around the same time, he made a non-speaking cameo in an episode of ¡Mucha Lucha! titled "Lucha, Rinse and Repeat".

Volume 4 of the Looney Tunes Golden Collection DVD series, released on November 14, 2006, has an entire disc of Speedy shorts, although some of his other shorts had previously been released on Volumes 1 and 3. Speedy is mentioned in one Duck Dodgers episode, after Cadet sits on Dodgers, prompting him to say, "I knew I should've chosen Speedy Gonzales as a sidekick!"

Speedy Gonzales appears in Bah, Humduck! A Looney Tunes Christmas. He is an employee at the Lucky Duck Superstore for the greedy Daffy Duck where he confuses Daffy with the Feliz Navidad comment.

Speedy Gonzales also appeared occasionally on The Looney Tunes Show. He is seen living with Bugs and Daffy as their "mouse in the wall" and running the pizza parlor Pizzarriba. Speedy is shown to act as Daffy's conscience, which is a far cry from the antagonistic relationship they had in the old days. The episode "Sunday Night Slice" showed that Bugs bought his favorite restaurant, Girardi's, to prevent it from being closed and hired Speedy to help him. When Bugs decides he does not want to own a restaurant anymore, he hands ownership of it to Speedy. In "The Black Widow", Speedy Gonzales answers Daffy Duck's call and races to Tacapulco to convince his cousin Sheriff Slowpoke Rodriguez to let Daffy Duck and Porky Pig out of jail.

Speedy Gonzales appeared in the 2015 straight to video movie Looney Tunes: Rabbits Run. He is seen as Lola Bunny's landlord.

An elderly Speedy Gonzales (voiced by Carlos Alazraqui) was "interviewed" by Al Madrigal for Madrigal's one-hour comedic documentary special Half Like Me (currently available on YouTube and formerly on Hulu).

Speedy Gonzales appeared occasionally in New Looney Tunes, often as the leader of a gang of mice that also includes Hubie and Bertie, Sniffles, and "Minnesota Rats" (originally Minniesoda Fats; an aborted 1970s character revived and fleshed out in this series). He seems to have reverted to his personality from Merrie Melodies.

In other media
In 1962, pop singer Pat Boone scored a top 10 hit in the United States with the song "Speedy Gonzales" which featured Mel Blanc samples as Speedy. It was also sung by Manolo Muñoz and several other artists.

In 1965, the movie Wild on the Beach included the song "Little Speedy Gonzales" which was written by Stan Ross and Bobby Beverly and performed by The Astronauts.

In 1995, he appeared in a video game, Speedy Gonzales: Los Gatos Bandidos, for the Super Nintendo Entertainment System.

In 2006, Volkswagen licensed Speedy Gonzales for a series of Spanish-language commercials for the Volkswagen Golf, using footage from the cartoon of the same name.

Speedy Gonzales starred in several video games: Cheese Cat-Astrophe Starring Speedy Gonzales for the Mega Drive/Genesis, Master System and Game Gear, Speedy Gonzales: Los Gatos Bandidos for the SNES, Speedy Gonzales for the Game Boy and Speedy Gonzales: Aztec Adventure for the Game Boy Color. He also appeared as an enemy in Looney Tunes: Back in Action, and Looney Tunes: Marvin Strikes Back! as both a miniboss and playable character.
In the 2018 film Overboard, Eugenio Derbez has a tattoo of Gonzalez.

Film adaptation 
In 2010, Warner Bros. and New Line Cinema announced a new Speedy Gonzales live action / animated feature film. George Lopez was attached to voice the character. In December 2015, it was reported that an animated film is in development at Warner Bros. In April 2016, it was announced that Eugenio Derbez will voice the character.

Voice actors
 Mel Blanc (1953–1989)
 Stan Freberg ("Day-O (The Banana Boat Song)" in Blue Peter)
 Noel Blanc (You Rang? answering machine messages)
 Greg Burson (Bugs Bunny's Birthday Ball, Acme Animation Factory, Speedy Gonzales: Los Gatos Bandidos, Quest for Camelot promotion)
 Joe Alaskey (Tiny Toon Adventures, Looney Tunes River Ride, Yosemite Sam and the Gold River Adventure!, Sunsoft commercial, The World of Bears with Bugs Bunny, The Looney Tunes Kwazy Christmas, Looney Tunes: Cartoon Conductor)
 Keith Scott (Canon commercials, The Looney Tunes Radio Show, Looney Rock)
 Jeff Bergman (Toon Biography: Speedy Gonzales, MetLife commercial)
 Eric Goldberg (Looney Tunes: Back in Action)
 Billy West (Looney Tunes: Back in Action – The Video Game)
 James Arnold Taylor (Drawn Together)
 Seth Green (Robot Chicken)
 Bob Bergen (Bah, Humduck! A Looney Tunes Christmas,  A Looney Tunes Sing-A-Long Christmas, Volkswagen commercials)
 Kerry Shale (Virgin Media commercials)
 Fred Armisen (The Looney Tunes Show, Looney Tunes: Rabbits Run)
 Damon Jones (singing voice in The Looney Tunes Show)
 Tim Dadabo (Scooby Doo and Looney Tunes: Cartoon Universe)
 Carlos Alazraqui (Half Like Me)
 Eric Bauza (Looney Tunes Dash, Looney Tunes: World of Mayhem, Looney Tunes Cartoons)
 Dino Andrade (New Looney Tunes)
 Gabriel Iglesias (Space Jam: A New Legacy)

See also

References

Further reading
 Nericcio, William Anthony (1996). “Autopsy of a Rat: Odd, Sundry Parables of Freddy Lopez, Speedy Gonzales, and Other Chicano/Latino Marionettes Prancing about Our First World Visual Emporium.” Camera Obscura 37 (January 1996): 189–237.
 Nericcio, William Anthony (2007). Tex[t]-Mex: Seductive Hallucinations of the "Mexican" in America. University of Texas Press.
 Schneider, Steve (1990). That's All Folks!: The Art of Warner Bros. Animation. Henry Holt & Co.
 Solomon, Charles (1994). The History of Animation: Enchanted Drawings. Random House Value Publishing.

External links

Speedy Gonzales at Don Markstein's Toonopedia. Archived from the original on July 29, 2017.
 The Tex(t)-Mex Galleryblog an archive for the second edition of the University of Texas Press (2007) book on stereotypes.
 

Looney Tunes characters
Anthropomorphic mice and rats
Fictional Mexican people
Fictional characters who can move at superhuman speeds
Film characters introduced in 1953
Fictional anthropomorphic characters
Male characters in animation
Ethnic humour
Film controversies
Race-related controversies in animation
Race-related controversies in film
Stereotypes of Hispanic and Latino people